Stacker 2 is an energy supplement company developed by NVE Pharmaceuticals in 1997. It got its name from "Stacking" which was what bodybuilders routinely engaged in by stacking and ingesting Ephedrine HCL, caffeine and aspirin to acquire more energy for a workout. It gained popularity in the early 2000s using WWE wrestlers, NASCAR drivers such as Kenny Wallace and other celebrities in their advertisements.

History
In 2005, NVE Pharmaceuticals filed for chapter 11 bankruptcy under the pressure from lawsuits. 

In 2006, Stacker 2 released the "6 hour power energy shot". 

In 2010, it was the 2nd best selling energy shot behind 5-hour Energy. 

In 2016, it lost a $22 million lawsuit against the Plaintiff 5-Hour Energy which accused Stacker 2 of infringement on its trademark.

References

Further reading

Energy drinks